Perry is an unincorporated community in northern Falls County, Texas, United States.  It was named after Albert G. Perry, a signer of the Texas Declaration of Independence.

References

	

Unincorporated communities in Falls County, Texas
Unincorporated communities in Texas